Estonia have competed at the Paralympic Games since the 1992 Summer events. Estonian Paralympic Committee was founded on April, 1991. Best athlete Marge Kõrkjas has performed in four Paralympics and won always at least one medal, total of 7 (2 Gold, 4 Silver and 1 Bronze). The two other gold medalists are Annely Ojastu and Sirly Tiik.

Medal tallies

Summer Paralympics

Best performances in bold.

Winter Paralympics

Best performances in bold.

Medallists

Summer Games

Winter Games

See also
 Estonia at the Olympics
 Estonia at the Special Olympics World Games

References